The Future Series Nouvelle-Aquitaine is an international badminton tournament held in Nouvelle-Aquitaine, France. The event is part of the Badminton World Federation's Future Series and part of the Badminton Europe Elite Circuit. It was held for the first time in 2022.

Host city

 2022: Pessac

Past winners

Performances by nation

References

External links
Future Series Nouvelle-Aquitaine

Badminton tournaments in France
2022 establishments in France